Lars-Erik Larsson (born 7 July 1937) is a retired Swedish rowing coxswain. He competed in the coxed pairs at the 1952 Summer Olympics, but failed to reach the final. Aged 15 he was the youngest Swedish participant at those games.

References

1937 births
Living people
Swedish male rowers
Olympic rowers of Sweden
Rowers at the 1952 Summer Olympics
People from Falkenberg
Sportspeople from Halland County